Amnat Charoen may refer to:

Amnat Charoen, a town
Amnat Charoen Province
Mueang Amnat Charoen district